The women's singles racquetball competition at the 2019 Pan American Games in Lima, Peru were held between August 2nd and 7th, 2019 at the Racquetball courts located at the Villa Deportiva Regional del Callao cluster. Paola Longoria of Mexico won gold in Women's Singles for a third consecutive time, and she's the most decorated women's player in Racquetball at the Pan American Games.

Schedule
All times are Central Standard Time (UTC-6).

Group stage

The competition begins with a round robin with athletes divided into groups. The top two athletes in each group advanced to the medal round. Groups was announced at the technical meeting the day before the competition begins.

Pool A

Pool B

Pool C

Pool D

Pool E

Pool F

Pool G

Playoffs

References

External links
Results book

Racquetball at the 2019 Pan American Games